The First Cumberland Presbyterian Church is a historic Cumberland Presbyterian church building in McKenzie, Tennessee, United States, that was added to the National Register of Historic Places in 1993.

Description
The church is located at 647 Stonewall Street North in central McKenzie, among several other church buildings, including a First Presbyterian Church, a First Baptist Church, and a First United Methodist Church .

History
The congregation was organized in 1867 as the "Bethlehem Congregation of the Cumberland Presbyterian Church at McKenzie, Tennessee." It moved into its first permanent building in 1873. In 1889 the congregation adopted the name "McKenzie Cumberland Presbyterian Church". The  Gothic building on Stonewall Street was built over the five-year period 1887 to 1892 at a cost of $8,000. It stood out in the community for its architecture, including a tall steeple over a high-vaulted slate roof, as well as its art glass windows.

In 1998 the congregation began a building project that culminated in 2002 with its relocation to a new  church at 16835 Highland Drive. Some of the old church's furnishings were to be moved to the new building, and its stained glass windows were placed in storage in preparation for their installation in the new church, which was expected to be done in 2014.

The former church building is now utilized by the Nursing Program of Bethel University.

See also

 National Register of Historic Places listings in Tennessee

Notes

References

External links
 Official website for the church congregation at its current location (not this building)

Presbyterian churches in Tennessee
Churches on the National Register of Historic Places in Tennessee
Gothic Revival church buildings in Tennessee
Churches completed in 1888
19th-century Presbyterian church buildings in the United States
Buildings and structures in Carroll County, Tennessee
1888 establishments in Ohio
National Register of Historic Places in Carroll County, Tennessee